This is a list of Latin words with derivatives in English (and other modern languages).

Ancient orthography did not distinguish between i and j or between u and v. Many modern works distinguish u from v but not i from j. In this article, both distinctions are shown as they are helpful when tracing the origin of English words. See also Latin phonology and orthography.

Nouns and adjectives
The citation form for nouns (the form normally shown in Latin dictionaries) is the Latin nominative singular, but that typically does not exhibit the root form from which English nouns are generally derived.

Verbs

Prepositions and other words used to form compound words

See also

Notes

References
 
 
 
 
 

 List of
History of the English language
Latin